Basavaiah Rachaiah (10 August 1922 – 14 February 2000) was an Indian politician. He was a member of the Karnataka Legislative Assembly and a member of the Rajya Sabha from Karnataka. He was elected to the Lok Sabha from Chamarajanagar Karnataka in 1977. He was the governor of Kerala and Himachal Pradesh and a Dalit leader, a member of the Karnataka state cabinets headed by S. Nijalingappa, B. D. Jatti, Devraj Urs, Veerendra Patil, Ramakrishna Hegde and S. R. Bommai.

Rachaiah was born in 1922 in Chamarajnagar and was an advocate by profession. One of his sons in Law, B. B. Ningaiah, was a minister in the government headed by J. H. Patel. Rachaiah died in 2000 aged 77.

Legacy 

For services rendered to the State, a circle on SayyajiRao Road in Mysore is named after Sri Rachaiah.

See also 
 List of Governors of Himachal Pradesh
 List of Governors of Kerala

References

External links 
Official biographical sketch in Parliament of India website

1922 births
2000 deaths
Governors of Himachal Pradesh
Governors of Kerala
Governors of Goa
India MPs 1977–1979
Rajya Sabha members from Karnataka
Lok Sabha members from Karnataka
People from Chamarajanagar district
Indian National Congress politicians from Karnataka
Mysore MLAs 1952–1957
Mysore MLAs 1957–1962
Mysore MLAs 1962–1967
Mysore MLAs 1967–1972
Members of the Mysore Legislature